Kinsman (also known as Kinsman Center) is an unincorporated community and census-designated place in Kinsman Township, Trumbull County, Ohio, United States. The population was 574 at the 2020 census. It is part of the Youngstown–Warren metropolitan area. It lies at the intersection of State Route 5 and State Route 7 between Williamsfield and Burghill. Kinsman has a post office with the ZIP code 44428; as well as a library, the Kinsman Free Public Library.

History

Kinsman is named for John Kinsman, a land agent.

Notable people
 Christopher Barzak, speculative and young-adult novelist and short-story writer; notable works include One for Sorrow, which was adapted into a film in 2014
 Philip Bliss, American hymn composer and abolitionist
 Leigh Brackett, noted female pioneer science-fiction author (The Long Tomorrow and many other works) and Hollywood screenwriter (The Big Sleep, Rio Bravo and many others). 
 Clarence Darrow, writer and defense attorney in the Scopes Monkey Trial, Ossian Sweet case, and Leopold and Loeb case
 Milan Ford, Wisconsin farmer and legislator
 Edmond Hamilton, noted science-fiction author (City at World's End and many others ) and writer of numerous Pulp magazine stories ( Captain Future (magazine) and many others). 
 Bill McKinley, American League umpire

References

External links
 Kinsman Township website

Unincorporated communities in Trumbull County, Ohio
Census-designated places in Trumbull County, Ohio
Unincorporated communities in Ohio